Imanol Alguacil Barrenetxea (born 4 July 1971), known simply as Imanol as a player, is a Spanish retired footballer who played as a right-back, currently manager of Real Sociedad.

He appeared in 121 matches in La Liga over nine seasons (eight goals scored), representing Real Sociedad and Villarreal. In 2014 he started working as a manager, with a four-year spell with Real Sociedad B followed by a short stint with the club's senior team in spring 2018, a role he was asked to take on again in the winter of the same year.

Playing career
Born in Orio, Gipuzkoa, Basque Country, Imanol was a Real Sociedad youth graduate. He made his senior debut with the reserves, spending two full seasons in Segunda División B.

On 29 September 1990, Imanol made his first-team – and La Liga – debut, playing the full 90 minutes in a 2–1 away loss against Real Oviedo. He was definitely promoted to the main squad in summer 1991, featuring regularly the following campaigns.

Imanol scored his first professional goal on 20 September 1992, netting his side's first in a 2–1 away win over Albacete Balompié. He was used rarely in the final years of his stint at the Anoeta Stadium as he dealt with several injury problems, leaving the club in 1998 after playing only four matches during the season.

In the 1998 off-season, Imanol joined Villarreal CF also of the top division, appearing sparingly in his first year and suffering relegation. After returning to the top flight in 2000 he was released, and moved to Segunda División's Real Jaén.

Imanol then resumed his career in the third tier, representing FC Cartagena and Burgos CF. He retired with the latter side in 2003, aged 32.

Coaching career
On 26 July 2011, Alguacil returned to his first club Real Sociedad, being appointed manager of the youth setup. On 17 June 2013 he was named reserve team coach Asier Santana's assistant, and was also in charge of the main squad along with Santana in November 2014 after Jagoba Arrasate's dismissal.

After the arrival of David Moyes in November 2014, Alguacil was included in the first team staff, but he was appointed manager of the B side late in that month. On 19 March 2018, he replaced the fired Eusebio Sacristán at the helm of the main squad until the end of the season.

In the summer of 2018, Alguacil returned to the reserves and Asier Garitano took over the senior role, but in December of the same year the latter was dismissed following a poor sequence of results and the former again became the first team coach. Following a strong start to the 2019–20 campaign, he was given a one-year contract extension. 

Alguacil led Real to their first trophy since 1987 on 3 April 2021, with a 1–0 victory against Basque rivals Athletic Bilbao in the 2020 Copa del Rey Final (postponed due to the COVID-19 pandemic). In the post-match press conference he celebrated by putting on a team jersey and scarf and chanting in joy.

Managerial statistics

Honours

Manager
Real Sociedad
Copa del Rey: 2019–20

References

External links
Profile at the Real Sociedad website

1971 births
Living people
People from Urola Kosta
Spanish footballers
Footballers from the Basque Country (autonomous community)
Association football defenders
La Liga players
Segunda División players
Segunda División B players
Real Sociedad B footballers
Real Sociedad footballers
Villarreal CF players
Real Jaén footballers
FC Cartagena footballers
Burgos CF footballers
Basque Country international footballers
Spanish football managers
La Liga managers
Segunda División B managers
Real Sociedad B managers
Real Sociedad managers
Real Sociedad non-playing staff